The 2009–10 Tunisian Ligue Professionnelle 1(Tunisian Professional League)  season was the 84th season of top-tier football in Tunisia. The competition began on 27 July 2009, and concluded on 15 May 2010. The defending champions from the previous season are Espérance de Tunis.

Team movements

Teams relegated to CPL-2
AS Marsa
Jendouba Sport

Teams promoted from CPL-2
ES Zarzis
JS Kairouan

Teams and venues

Results

League table

Result table

Leaders

External links
 2009–10 Ligue 1 on RSSSF.com

Tunisian Ligue Professionnelle 1 seasons
1
Tunisia